American football is a sport played in Japan. Introduced in the 1930s, the sport has grown into one of the most popular in the country. Each team is only allowed to have three Americans per team.

History
American football was introduced in the early 1930s back when Paul Rusch, a teacher and missionary from Kentucky, who came to Japan in 1925 to help rebuild following the 1923 earthquake, George Marshall, an athletic teacher at Tokyo based Rikkyo University, and two military attaches at the US embassy, Alexander George and Merritt Booth, helped to form the first football teams at three universities in Tokyo (Waseda, Meiji, Rikkyo). In November 1934, the first football game was played between an all-star team of the three Tokyo universities and a team of the Yokohama Country and Athletic Club consisting of Americans and Britons living in Japan. The Japanese college team won the game. In 1937, a game between college all-star teams from eastern and western Japan drew a crowd of about 25,000 spectators. The reason for the success of the rough North American game in mild-mannered Japan might be that American Football offers a combination of power, technical precision, discipline and team spirit that is hard to find in other sports and that most parts of this combination (precision, discipline, team spirit) match well with traditional Japanese values.

During World War II (1939–1945), American football in Japan came to a halt. However, soon after the war, football in Japan resumed. Rusch, who had earlier left Japan for the war, returned in 1945. During the following years, high school and junior high school teams were formed.

Today, more than 17,000 players participate in a national competition for about 400 teams. There are two college football leagues, the Kanto League with teams from eastern Japan and the Kansai League with teams from western Japan. Each league has different divisions. The Division I of the Kanto League has two Conferences (A and B). The champions of the two leagues battle for the college championship in the Koshien Bowl.

The highest level of American Football in Japan is the X-League, an amateur league consisting of true company teams and club teams sponsored by companies. The company league was founded in 1981; since 1996, it has been called the X-League. Like the college leagues, the X-League has different divisions. The Division I has three regional divisions (East, Central, West). The two top teams of each division advance to the playoffs, called the Final 6. The championship game is called Japan X Bowl and is held in December. The X-League champion then plays against the college champion in the Rice Bowl for the Japanese national championship.

Organization

Professional

The X-League is the highest level of football in Japan. In recent years, professionals from overseas have played in the X-League, including former NFL quarterback Devin Gardner. All players in the league are amateur.

University and collegiate
College football in Japan, often played at the club level, is made up of eight leagues, spanning all four islands. The East and West champions play in the annual Koshien Bowl in Nishinomiya.

East (東日本)
 Kantoh Collegiate American Football Association
 Hokkaido American Football Association
 Tohoku Collegiate American Football Association

West (西日本)
 Chushikoku Collegiate American Football Association
 Hokuriku Collegiate American Football League
 Kansai Collegiate American Football League
 Kyūshū Collegiate American Football Association
 Tokai Collegiate American Football Association

The winners of the Japan X Bowl and Koshien Bowl play each other in the Rice Bowl.

Japan national American football team

References

External links

American Football in Japan
Japan American Football Association